The Billboard Top Inspirational Albums chart ranks the best-selling Christian music albums of the week in the United States. In the 1980s, 28 albums by twelve different artists reached the top. The artist with the most number-one albums was Amy Grant, who placed eight albums for a total of 285 weeks atop. Her fourth studio album, Age to Age (1982), is the longest reigning album in the chart's history, with 85 consecutive weeks from July 1982 through March 1984.

Number ones

External links
 Billboard magazine archive

Inspirational 1980s
United States Inspirational